Likeness may refer to:
 The Likeness, a 2008 mystery novel by Tana French
 Image of God
 Likeness, a short film by Rodrigo Prieto starring Elle Fanning

People with the surname
 James Likeness, American graphic designer and musician from Hawaii

See also
 Homoiōma
 Simulacrum
 Likeness rights or personality rights